Frederick Segrest (December 21, 1926 – October 27, 2018), known professionally as Freddie Hart, was an American country musician and songwriter best known for his chart-topping country song and lone pop hit "Easy Loving," which won the Country Music Association Song of the Year award in 1971 and 1972.

Hart charted singles from 1953 to 1987, and later became a gospel singer. He also performed at music festivals and other venues until his death in 2018.

Biography

Childhood and military service
Hart was born to a sharecropper family in Loachapoka, Alabama, United States, and spent his childhood in nearby Phenix City, Alabama, along with his 11 siblings (Nadine, Bo, Junior, Olin, Marrell, Pearl, Lonnie, Sandra, Gail, J.P., Harold, and a child who died in infancy). He learned to play guitar at age 5 and quit school by age 12. At age 15, Hart lied about his age to join the U.S. Marine Corps during World War II, seeing combat action on Guam and Iwo Jima. Following the war, Hart lived in California where he taught classes in self-defense at the Los Angeles Police Academy.

Early career
Hart got an early career break when singer Carl Smith covered Hart's song "Loose Talk" in 1955. Other artists who recorded his songs included Patsy Cline ("Lovin' In Vain"), George Jones ("My Tears are Overdue") and Porter Wagoner ("Skid Row Joe").

During the early 1950s, Hart and his family moved to California to further the growing country music scene there. In 1951, he joined Lefty Frizzell's band for a year. It was through Frizzell that Hart got his first recording contract with Capitol Records in 1953. He released several singles including his version of "Loose Talk", but none of these were successful. In 1958, Hart signed with Columbia Records and scored his first chart hit with "The Wall" in 1959 which made the Top 20. His biggest hit for the label was the 1960 Top 20 hit "The Key's In The Mailbox".

In 1965, Hart signed with Kapp Records where he would score several Top 40 hits between 1965 and 1968. The biggest of these hits included "Hank Williams' Guitar" (1965), "Born A Fool" (1968) and "Togetherness" (1968).

Re-signing with Capitol Records and Easy Loving
In 1969, Hart re-signed with Capitol Records and soon became a part of the Bakersfield sound by signing up with Buck Owens' songwriting and management company. In early 1970, he scored a Top 30 hit with "The Whole World's Holdin' Hands". Hart's song "Togetherness", a hit for him in 1968, became a Top 15 hit for Buck Owens and Susan Raye that summer. Hart would score several minor hits during the year.

In 1971, Hart released a song that he wrote called "Easy Loving" which was first recorded in the summer of 1969 for his album California Grapevine, released in 1970. Released in the summer of 1971, "Easy Loving" rapidly began climbing the charts; and by that September, it was No. 1 for three weeks on the country chart and reached No. 17 on the pop chart. It was also played on adult contemporary stations, earning a position on Billboard's Easy Listening survey. The song would ultimately win Hart numerous awards from both the Academy of Country Music and Country Music Association. The song sold over one million copies, and was awarded a gold record by the R.I.A.A. in November 1971. The album of the same name also reportedly went gold. The song also earned Hart a Grammy Award nomination.

From this success, Hart and his backup band, the Heartbeats, had a string of Top 5 hits with "My Hang-Up Is You" (six weeks at No. 1 in 1972), "Bless Your Heart" (No. 1 in 1972), "Got the All Overs For You (All Over Me)" (No. 1 in 1972), "If You Can't Feel It (It Ain't There)" (1973), "Super Kind of Woman" (No. 1 in 1973), "Trip to Heaven" (No. 1 in 1973), "Hang In There Girl" (1974), "The Want-To's" (1974), "My Woman's Man" (1975), "The First Time" (1975), "I'd Like To Sleep Till I Get Over You" (1975) and "The Warm Side of You" (1975). He has been called by many fans as "The Heart and Soul of Country Music".

With the success of "Easy Loving" and other songs he wrote, plus a popular concert attraction on the road, Hart became independently wealthy and owned a songwriting company, a school for the blind, a trucking company, and a chain of martial arts studios—his hobby was as a master of karate.

Late 1970s–1980s
By 1976, Hart continued to have major hits although now his streak of Top 10s were replaced by a streak of Top 20 and Top 30 hits. These included "You Are The Song Inside Of Me" (1976), "That Look In Her Eyes" (1976), "Thank God She's Mine" (1977), "The Pleasure's Been All Mine" (1977), "Toe to Toe" (1978), and "Wasn't It Easy Baby" (1979). His last Top 10 hit came with the hit "Why Lovers Turn to Strangers" in 1977, which peaked at No. 8. This song was written by east Idaho based composer Bobby Fender.

In 1980, Hart signed with Sunbird Records, and immediately scored a Top 20 hit with "Sure Thing" that year. He followed this up with three Top 40 hits in 1981. This ended his days as a major country artist. In 1985 and 1987, he had a couple of minor hits on El Dorado and 5th Avenue Records, with his last hit being "The Best Love I Never Had" in 1987 peaking at No. 77.

Later years and death
In 2001, Hart was inducted into the Alabama Music Hall of Fame A few years later, Phenix City declared a major east-west street Freddie Hart Parkway in his honor.

Hart released a handful of new albums on CD, showcasing his passion for gospel music, patriotism and the traditional country sound that originally made him famous. These albums prompted him to selectively tour and perform concerts around the world. Hart retained a large following in Europe and the U.S., performing at music festivals, universities, churches and industry events.

Hart continued to write and record gospel music during the 2000s. He received numerous awards and had several number one songs in the gospel field. In 2004 he was inducted into the Nashville Songwriter's Hall Of Fame. In 2017 he performed in Pigeon Forge Tennessee and received the Hall Of Fame award from the North American Country Music Associations International. His final performance was in March 2018 on the Ernest Tubb Midnite Jamboree as a special guest to David Frizzell. Hart sang a new song he had written and just recorded about Lefty Frizzell, titled simply "Lefty". In April 2018, Hart recorded his final album titled God Bless You. The project, produced by David Frizzell, contains 11 newly written gospel songs and a remake of his signature song "Easy Loving". The album was released in late 2018.

Hart died as a result of pneumonia on October 27, 2018 in Burbank, California.

Discography

Albums

AEasy Loving also peaked at No. 67 on the RPM Top Albums chart.

Singles 

A"Easy Loving" also peaked at No. 17 on the Billboard Hot 100, No. 31 on the Canadian RPM Adult Contemporary Tracks chart and No. 21 on the RPM Top Singles chart.

The Heartbeats
Freddie Hart first used the name Heartbeats, a play on his last name, as his backing on a one-off 1967 album credited to Freddie Hart and the Heartbeats, but after his hit "Easy Loving" in 1971, ten studio albums were released between 1972 and 1977 credited to Freddie Hart and the Heartbeats. Various musicians performed in the Heartbeats over the years, including Bobby Wayne and Dennis Hromek, both of whom would go on to join the Strangers. During their heyday in the mid-1970s, the Heartbeats even released one studio album credited to just themselves in 1975.

Awards and nominations

References

Bibliography
Cusic, Don. "Freddie Hart". In The Encyclopedia of Country Music (1998). Paul Kingsbury, Editor. New York: Oxford University Press. pp. 230–1.

External links

In the Alabama Hall Of Fame

1926 births
2018 deaths
People from Lee County, Alabama
Musicians from Columbus, Georgia
People from Phenix City, Alabama
People from Russell County, Alabama
Military personnel from Alabama
American male singer-songwriters
American country singer-songwriters
Country musicians from Alabama
Country musicians from Georgia (U.S. state)
Singer-songwriters from Alabama
Singer-songwriters from Georgia (U.S. state)